Trigonopterus enam is a species of flightless weevil in the genus Trigonopterus from Indonesia.

Etymology
The specific name is derived from the Indonesian word for "six".

Description
Individuals measure 2.06–2.24 mm in length.  Body is slightly oval in shape.  General coloration is black, with rust-colored antennae, tarsi, and tibiae.

Range

Phylogeny
T. enam is part of the T. saltator species group.

References

enam
Beetles described in 2014
Beetles of Asia
Insects of Indonesia